The International Institute for Inter-Religious Dialogue and Diplomacy is an affiliated institution of EUCLID (Euclid University). Its main focus is education in the application of diplomatic methods to interreligious dialogue, notably between Christianity and Islam.

References

Christian and Islamic interfaith dialogue
Religious studies
Universities and colleges in the Gambia